Maria of Aragon (–1347 in Sijena) was a daughter of James II of Aragon and his second wife Blanche of Anjou.

She married Peter of Castile, Lord of Cameros (1290–1319), son of Sancho IV of Castile. Their daughter, Blanche of Castile (1319–1375), was betrothed to Peter I of Portugal but the marriage never took place. Maria died at Sijena in 1347.

1299 births
1347 deaths
Crown of Aragon
14th-century people from the Kingdom of Aragon
Aragonese infantas
14th-century Spanish women
13th-century Spanish women
13th-century people from the Kingdom of Aragon
Daughters of kings